Trinity Episcopal Church is a historic church building in St. Charles, Minnesota, United States, constructed in 1874.  It was listed on the National Register of Historic Places in 1984 for having local significance in the theme of architecture.  It was nominated for the high integrity of its Carpenter Gothic design, well preserved in both the exterior and interior.

The church's board and batten walls and lancet windows and door are typical of Carpenter Gothic style architecture, while its center entry bell tower is atypical.  It is no longer in use as a church and is included now on city park property just west of the city hall.

See also
 List of Anglican churches
 National Register of Historic Places listings in Winona County, Minnesota

References

External links

19th-century Episcopal church buildings
Carpenter Gothic church buildings in Minnesota
Churches completed in 1874
Churches in Winona County, Minnesota
Episcopal church buildings in Minnesota
Churches on the National Register of Historic Places in Minnesota
National Register of Historic Places in Winona County, Minnesota